Eucosma nitorana is a species of moth of the family Tortricidae. It is found in China and the Russian Far East.

References

Moths described in 1962
Eucosmini